Cheick Diallo (born September 13, 1996) is a Malian professional basketball player for the Kyoto Hannaryz of the B.League. Diallo was a five-star recruit and the MVP (Most Valuable Player) of the 2015 McDonald's All-American Boys Game. He played one season of college basketball for Kansas before declaring for the 2016 NBA draft, where he was selected with the 33rd overall pick by the Los Angeles Clippers.

Early life
Diallo was born and raised in Kayes, Mali. It took approximately 15 hours to drive from his hometown to Bamako, the country's capital city. He was the youngest in his family and had five brothers. He often played basketball with his older friends and family which brought out his skills. Diallo moved to the United States in February 2012 in pursuit of a basketball career. He was not fluent in the English language at the time. He recalled the time, "It was so tough. I left my parents, my friends, my brothers, everything, just to come here.'" Diallo began playing basketball in 2010.

High school career

Through its international program, Diallo began attending Our Savior New American School in Centereach, New York. He played with Chris Obekpa in his freshman season and, at first, was dominated by the fellow African big man. Diallo said, "I didn't know what I was doing. I couldn't make a point. [Obekpa] blocked me every time." In later seasons, he became more effective for his team and attracted attention through his shot-blocking, rebounding, and versatility. Diallo was invited to the NBPA Top 100 camp in 2013 and went on to become its first MVP from Africa. As a junior in 2014, he averaged 18.5 points, 11.2 rebounds, and 4.0 blocks per game while leading his team to a 28–3 record and a division championship. As a senior, Diallo averaged 17.5 points, 10.5 rebounds, and 2.5 blocks per game. Diallo was named MVP of the 2015 McDonald's All-American Boys Game after scoring 18 points and 10 rebounds leading the East team to a 111–91 win over the West. Diallo was also named MVP of the 2015 Jordan Brand Classic, tallied 26 points and 11 rebounds. Diallo was rated as a five-star recruit and ranked as the No. 7 overall recruit and No. 3 power forward in the 2015 high school class. On April 28, 2015, Diallo committed to Kansas.

College career
Diallo missed the first five games of his freshman season with Kansas after the NCAA failed to clear him to play due to eligibility concerns. On November 25, 2015, he was cleared to play for the Jayhawks in their game against Loyola on December 1, after the NCAA ultimately ruled Diallo had received a limited amount of impermissible benefits. In his lone season at Kansas, Diallo averaged 3.0 points and 2.5 rebounds in 7.5 minutes per game.

In April 2016, Diallo declared for the NBA draft, forgoing his final three years of college eligibility. In May 2016, at the NBA Draft Combine, Diallo registered a 7-foot, 4½-inch wingspan and an 8-foot-11½ standing reach.

Professional career

New Orleans Pelicans (2016–2019)
On June 23, 2016, Diallo was selected by the Los Angeles Clippers with the 33rd overall pick in 2016 NBA draft. Diallo was traded to the New Orleans Pelicans later that night. On July 22, 2016, he signed with the Pelicans after averaging 10.2 points, 9.4 rebounds and 2.2 blocks in five Summer League games. He made his NBA debut on October 29, 2016, recording one rebound and one block in six minutes off the bench in the Pelicans' 98–79 loss to the San Antonio Spurs. Diallo played in just two games for a total of seven minutes over the Pelicans' first 23 games of the season. On December 10, 2016, he played in just under 31 minutes off the bench and scored 19 points in the Pelicans' 133–105 loss to the Los Angeles Clippers. He also recorded 10 rebounds and shot 8-of-15 from the field. On April 11, 2017, he scored 19 points in a 108–96 loss to the Los Angeles Lakers. The following day, in the Pelicans' season finale, Diallo had 12 points and 16 rebounds in a 103–100 win over the Portland Trail Blazers. During his rookie season, he had multiple assignments with the Austin Spurs, Long Island Nets and Greensboro Swarm of the NBA Development League, pursuant to the flexible assignment rule.

On March 9, 2018, Diallo scored a season-high 14 points in a 116–97 loss to the Washington Wizards. On March 18, 2018, he set a new season high with 17 points in a 108–89 win over the Boston Celtics.

On February 6, 2019, Diallo scored a season-high 18 points in a 125–120 win over the Chicago Bulls. On February 22, he had 16 points and a career-high 18 rebounds in a 126–111 loss to the Indiana Pacers. Diallo matched his season high of 18 points with perfect shooting in a 128–115 win over the Los Angeles Lakers on February 23.

Phoenix Suns (2019–2020)
On July 23, 2019, the Phoenix Suns signed Diallo to a two-year contract. On November 24, Diallo scored a career-high 22 points in a 114–102 loss to the Denver Nuggets.

Avtodor Saratov (2021)
On February 2, 2021, Diallo signed with Avtodor Saratov of the VTB United League.

Fuenlabrada (2021)
On April 14, 2021, Diallo signed with Fuenlabrada of the Spanish Liga ACB.

Motor City Cruise / Detroit Pistons (2021–2022)
On November 8, 2021, Diallo signed with the Motor City Cruise of the NBA G League. In 13 games, he averaged 14.4 points on 71.4% shooting and 8.5 rebounds in 21.7 minutes per game.

On December 23, 2021, Diallo signed a 10-day contract with the Detroit Pistons via the hardship exemption and after his expired, he was re-acquirerd by Motor City.

Cangrejeros de Santurce (2022–present)
On May 1, 2022, Diallo signed with the Cangrejeros de Santurce of the BSN.

Career statistics

NBA

Regular season

|-
| style="text-align:left;"| 
| style="text-align:left;"| New Orleans
| 17 || 0 || 11.7 || .474 || – || .714 || 4.3 || .2 || .2 || .4 || 5.1
|-
| style="text-align:left;"| 
| style="text-align:left;"| New Orleans
| 52 || 0 || 11.2 || .580 || – || .758 || 4.1 || .4 || .2 || .4 || 4.9
|-
| style="text-align:left;"| 
| style="text-align:left;"| New Orleans
| 64 || 1 || 14.0 || .620 || .250 || .746 || 5.2 || .5 || .5 || .5 || 6.0
|-
| style="text-align:left;"| 
| style="text-align:left;"| Phoenix
| 47 || 2 || 10.2 || .648 || .333 || .872 || 2.8 || .5 || .2 || .3 || 4.7
|-
| style="text-align:left;"| 
| style="text-align:left;"| Detroit
| 3 || 0 || 10.2 || .375 || – || .833 || 4.0 || .0 || .3 || .0 || 3.7
|- class="sortbottom"
| style="text-align:center;" colspan="2"| Career
| 183 || 3 || 11.9 || .596 || .286 || .774 || 4.1 || .4 || .3 || .4 || 5.2

Playoffs

|-
| style="text-align:left;"| 2018
| style="text-align:left;"| New Orleans
| 7 || 0 || 6.9 || .417 || – || – || 1.3 || .0 || .1 || .1 || 1.4
|- class="sortbottom"
| style="text-align:center;" colspan="2"| Career
| 7 || 0 || 6.9 || .417 || – || – || 1.3 || .0 || .1 || .1 || 1.4

College

|-
| style="text-align:left;"| 2015–16
| style="text-align:left;"| Kansas
| 27 || 1 || 7.5 || .569 || – || .556 || 2.5 || .0 || .3 || .9 || 3.0

References

External links

Kansas Jayhawks bio

1996 births
Living people
21st-century Malian people
Austin Spurs players
Baloncesto Fuenlabrada players
Basketball players from New York (state)
Centers (basketball)
Detroit Pistons players
Greensboro Swarm players
Kansas Jayhawks men's basketball players
Liga ACB players
Long Island Nets players
Los Angeles Clippers draft picks
Malian expatriate basketball people in the United States
Malian men's basketball players
McDonald's High School All-Americans
Motor City Cruise players
New Orleans Pelicans players
Parade High School All-Americans (boys' basketball)
People from Centereach, New York
People from Kayes
Phoenix Suns players
Power forwards (basketball)
Sportspeople from Suffolk County, New York
Malian expatriate basketball people in Spain
Malian expatriate basketball people in Russia
Malian expatriate basketball people in Japan